Hotel California is the fifth studio album by American rock band Eagles. Released on December 8, 1976, by Asylum Records, Hotel California was recorded by Bill Szymczyk at the Criteria and Record Plant studios between March and October 1976. It was the band's first album with guitarist Joe Walsh, who had replaced founding member Bernie Leadon, and the last to feature founding bassist Randy Meisner. The front cover is a photograph of the Beverly Hills Hotel by David Alexander.

Hotel California topped the US Billboard Top LPs & Tapes chart. At the 20th Grammy Awards, the title track won Record of the Year, and "New Kid in Town" won Best Arrangement for Voices. The album was also nominated for Album of the Year but lost to Fleetwood Mac's Rumours. Three singles were released from the album, with the title track and "New Kid in Town" topping the Billboard Hot 100 and "Life in the Fast Lane" reaching No. 11.

Hotel California is one of the best-selling albums of all time. It has been certified 26× Platinum in the US, and has sold over 32 million copies worldwide, making it the band's best-selling album after Their Greatest Hits (1971–1975). It has been ranked as one of the greatest albums of all time. In 2003 and 2012, it was ranked number 37 on Rolling Stone list of "The 500 Greatest Albums of All Time". A 40th anniversary special edition of Hotel California was released in November 2017.

Theme
The first song written for the album was "Hotel California", which became the theme for the album. Henley said of the themes of the songs in the album: 

On the title "Hotel California", Henley said that "the word, 'California,' carries with it all kinds of connotations, powerful imagery, mystique, etc., that fires the imaginations of people in all corners of the globe. There's a built-in mythology that comes with that word, an American cultural mythology that has been created by both the film and the music industry."  In an interview with the Dutch magazine ZigZag shortly before the album's release, Don Henley said:

Composition
Bernie Leadon, who was the principal country influence in the band, left the band after the release of the previous album One of These Nights.  For Hotel California, the band made a conscious decision to move away from country rock, and wrote some songs that are more rock & roll, such as "Victim of Love" and "Life in the Fast Lane". Leadon was replaced by Joe Walsh who provided the opening guitar riff of "Life in the Fast Lane" that was then developed into the song. The title for "Life in the Fast Lane" was inspired by a conversation between Frey and his drug dealer during a high speed car ride.

The chord progression and basic melody of the title track, "Hotel California", was written by Don Felder. Don Henley wrote most of the lyrics, with contributions from Glenn Frey. Henley noted that the hotel had become a "literal and symbolic focal point of their lives at that time", and it became the theme of the song. Frey wanted the song to be "more cinematic", and to write it "just like it was a movie".  Henley sought inspiration for the lyrics by driving out into the desert, as well as from films and theatre. Parts of the lyrics of "Hotel California" as well as the song "Wasted Time" were based on Henley's break up with his then girlfriend Loree Rodkin.

Frey, in the "Hotel California" episode of In the Studio with Redbeard, spoke about the writing of "The Last Resort".  Frey said: "It was the first time that Don took it upon himself to write an epic story and we were already starting to worry about the environment… we're constantly screwing up paradise and that was the point of the song and that at some point there is going to be no more new frontiers. I mean we're putting junk, er, garbage into space now."

Allegedly stolen lyric sheets

In July 2022 three men, all involved in rare book and memorabilia dealing, were indicted by a Manhattan, New York City, grand jury on felony charges of conspiracy and possession of stolen property; one was further charged with hindering prosecution. Prosecutors alleged that they had forged provenance documents attempting to demonstrate that they were the lawful owners of some of Frey and Henley's original drafts of lyrics for songs on the album, including "Hotel California" and "Life in the Fast Lane" and "New Kid in Town", when they in fact knew those materials, around a hundred handwritten pages on yellow notebook paper estimated to be worth $1 million in total, to have been stolen. Their plot had come to light after, having sold Henley some of the documents for $8,500 in 2012, they returned to Henley offering to sell him some more after listing them at Sotheby's four years later; he then filed a complaint with the New York County district attorney's office. All three protested their innocence through their attorneys.

The three were alleged to have acquired the documents from Ed Sanders, a journalist who had been hired to write a biography of the band around the time of Hotel California. Sanders did not finish the work until after the band had broken up and the project was eventually canceled. He is not charged or named in the indictment, but in a news release announcing it, the D.A.'s office described the papers as " originally stolen in the late 1970s by an author who had been hired to write a biography of the band." The indictment also quotes an "Individual 1" as telling one of the indicted men in an email that he "was staying at Henley's place in Malibu and had total access to his boxes of stuff, and there was a lot, and I compiled a box of files I wanted and his assistant mailed them to me." The Los Angeles Times found also that an archived version of the 2016 Sotheby's listing online identified Sanders as the then-owner.

Recording
The album was recorded between March and October 1976 at Criteria Studios, Miami and Record Plant Studios, Los Angeles, and produced by Bill Szymczyk. Although the band favored Los Angeles, the producer Szymczyk wanted to record in Miami as he had developed a fear of living on a fault line in Los Angeles after experiencing an earthquake, and a compromise was then struck to split the recording at both places.  While the band were recording the album, Black Sabbath were recording Technical Ecstasy in an adjacent studio at Criteria Studios in Miami. The band was forced to stop recording on numerous occasions because Black Sabbath were too loud and the sound was coming through the wall. The last track of the album, "The Last Resort" had to be re-recorded a number of times due to noise from the next studio.

For the title track "Hotel California", after the arrangement and instrumentation had been refined, several takes were recorded. The best parts were then spliced together, in all 33 edits on the two‑inch master, to create the final version. In contrast, "Victim of Love" was recorded in a live session in studio apart from the lead vocal and the harmony on the choruses which were added later. Don Felder initially sang the lead vocals in the many early takes for the song, but the band felt that his efforts were not up to the required standard, and Henley then took over as the lead.

According to Henley in a 1982 interview, the Eagles "probably peaked on Hotel California." Henley said: "After that, we started growing apart as collaborators and as friends."

Artwork

The front cover artwork is a photograph of The Beverly Hills Hotel shot just before sunset by David Alexander with design and art direction by Kosh.  According to Kosh, Henley wanted him to find a place that can portray the Hotel California of the album title, and "portray it with a slightly sinister edge".  Three hotels were photographed, and the one with The Beverly Hills Hotel was selected as the cover. The photographer shot the image 60 feet above Sunset Boulevard on top of a cherry picker.  As the image was taken from an unfamiliar vantage point  in fading light, most people did not initially recognize the hotel. However, when the identity of Beverly Hills Hotel was revealed, the hotel threatened legal action over the use of the image.

The rear album cover was shot in the lobby of the Lido Hotel in Hollywood. The gatefold image shows the same lobby but filled with members of the band and their friends.  Henley said: "I wanted a collection of people from all walks of life, It’s people on the edge, on the fringes of society." A shadowy figure appears on the balcony above the lobby, which led to speculations over the person's identity.

Kosh designed a Hotel California logo as a neon sign which was used on the album cover and in its promotional materials. As it proved difficult to bend real neon tubings into the desired shape of the script, the neon effect of the logo was achieved with airbrush by Bob Hickson. Additional portraits of the band used in the album package and promotional materials were shot by Norman Seeff.

Release
The album was released by Asylum Records on  December 8, 1976, in vinyl, cassette and 8-track cartridge formats. It was considered for quadraphonic release in early 1977, but this idea was dropped following the demise of the quadraphonic format. On the album's 25th anniversary in 2001, it was released in a Multichannel 5.1 DVD-Audio disc. On August 17, 2011, the album was released on a hybrid SACD in Japan in The Warner Premium Sound series, containing both a stereo and a 5.1 mix.

Original vinyl pressings of Hotel California (Elektra/Asylum catalog no. 7E-1084) had custom picture labels of a blue Hotel California logo with a yellow background. These also had text engraved in the run-out groove of each side, continuing an in-joke trend the band had started with their third album On the Border. The text reads: Side one: "Is It 6 O'Clock Yet?"; Side two: "V.O.L. Is Five-Piece Live", indicating that the song "Victim of Love" was recorded in a live session in studio, with no overdubbing. Joe Walsh and Glenn Frey confirm this on the inner booklet of The Very Best Of. This only referred to the instrumental track, however; the lead vocal and harmony for the chorus were added later. This was in response to those who criticized the Eagles' practice of copious overdubbing of instruments and that they were too clinical and soulless in the studio. They wanted to demonstrate that they could play together without overdubs if they wanted to.

A 40th anniversary deluxe edition was released on November 24, 2017. The set includes the original remastered album, and a second CD that features 10 live tracks from the concert at The Forum, recorded in October 1976 two months before the original release of the album. This bonus CD was also issued as a stand-alone vinyl LP in 2021.

Critical reception

Hotel California was met with generally positive reviews. Village Voice critic Robert Christgau felt it was their "most substantial if not their most enjoyable LP", while Charley Walters of Rolling Stone felt it showcased "both the best and worst tendencies of Los Angeles-situated rock". Both critics picked up on the album's California themes – Christgau remarking that while it may in places be "pretentious and condescending" and that "Don Henley is incapable of conveying a mental state as complex as self-criticism", the band couldn't have written the songs on side one "without caring about their California theme down deep"; Walters in contrast felt the "lyrics present a convincing and unflattering portrait of the milieu itself", and that Don Henley's vocals express well "the weary disgust of a victim (or observer) of the region's luxurious excess". Billboard gave the album high praise: "The casually beautiful, quietly-intense multileveled vocal harmonies and brilliant original songs that meld solid  emotional words with lovely melody lines are all back in force, keeping the Eagles at the acme of acoustic electric soft rock."  It noted that, even though the album did not try out any new departure other than the "Procol Harum-type" title track, "the album proves that there's a lot more left to explore profitably and artistically in the L.A. countryish-rock style."

Retrospective reviews have also been positive. Robert Hilburn of the Los Angeles Times, writing after the band broke up, called the album "a legitimate rock masterpiece", in which the band "examined their recurring theme about the American Dream with more precision, power and daring than ever in such stark, uncompromising songs as "Hotel California" and "The Last Resort"." William Ruhlmann from AllMusic later said "Hotel California unveiled what seemed almost like a whole new band. It was a band that could be bombastic, but also one that made music worthy of the later tag of 'classic rock', music appropriate for the arenas and stadiums the band was playing." Steve Holtje, writing for CultureCatch in 2012, felt that even though "an awful lot of the album is snarky whining from co-leaders Don Henley and Glenn Frey, two guys who didn't really seem like they had that much they could legitimately complain about", in the final analysis "Hotel California and the underrated concept album Desperado stand as the group's greatest statements".

Ultimate Classic Rock critic Sterling Whitaker rated both "Wasted Time" and "The Last Resort" as being among the Eagles' 10 most underrated songs.

Accolades 
Hotel California was the Eagles' sixth album (including Their Greatest Hits (1971–1975)), and fifth of original material. It became a critical and commercial success. In a poll of rock critics and DJs in 1987, it was ranked 48 out of 100. In a public poll for the 1994 edition of All Time Top 1000 Albums, it was voted number 107, and then number 67 in the 2000 edition. In 2001, the TV network VH1 placed Hotel California at number 38 on their 100 Greatest Albums of All Time list. Hotel California was ranked 13th in a 2005 survey held by British television's Channel 4 to determine the 100 greatest albums of all time. In 2003, the album was ranked number 37 on Rolling Stone magazine's list of the 500 greatest albums of all time, maintaining the rating in a 2012 revised list, dropping to number 118 in the 2020 reboot of the list.

The song "Hotel California" was ranked number 49 on Rolling Stone list of "The 500 Greatest Songs of All Time" in 2004. It maintained the ranking in 2010, and was re-ranked at number 311 in 2021.

Awards and nominations
The album and its tracks were nominated for five Grammy awards in 1978, winning two; Record of the Year for the title track and Best Arrangement for Voices for "New Kid in Town". However, the band's manager Irving Azoff refused requests by the ceremony's producer for the band to attend or perform at the ceremony unless a win was guaranteed.  The band therefore did not appear at the ceremony to collect their awards. Henley later said: "The whole idea of a contest to see who is 'best' just doesn't appeal to us."

Commercial performance
The album first entered the US Billboard 200 at number four, reaching number one in its fourth week in January 1977. It topped the chart for eight weeks (non-consecutively), and it was certified platinum by the Recording Industry Association of America (RIAA) in a week of release. In its first year of release it sold nearly 6 million copies in the United States, and by July 1978 it has sold 9.5 million copies worldwide (7 million in the US and 2.5 million elsewhere internationally). On March 20, 2001, the album was certified 16× platinum by the Recording Industry Association of America, denoting shipment of 16 million in the United States, and had sold over 17 million copies in the US by 2013. Worldwide the album has sold 32 million copies. On August 20, 2018, the album was certified 26× platinum by the RIAA for 26 million units consumed in the United States under the new system that tallies album and digital track sales as well as streams.

The album produced two number one hit singles on the US Billboard Hot 100: "New Kid in Town", on February 26, 1977, and "Hotel California" on May 7, 1977.

Track listing

Personnel 
Adapted from AllMusic and album liner notes.

Eagles 
 Don Felder – guitars, backing vocals, pedal steel guitar on “The Last Resort”
 Glenn Frey – guitars, backing vocals, keyboards, lead vocals on “New Kid In Town”
 Don Henley – drums, percussion, lead vocals, backing vocals, synthesizer on “The Last Resort”
 Randy Meisner – bass, backing vocals, lead vocals on “Try and Love Again,” guitarrón on “New Kid in Town”
 Joe Walsh – guitars, keyboards, backing vocals, lead vocals on “Pretty Maids All in a Row”

Production 
 Bill Szymczyk – producer, mixing
 Allan Blazek, Bruce Hensal, Ed Mashal, Bill Szymczyk – engineers
 Jim Ed Norman – string arrangements, conductor
 Sid Sharp – concert master
 Don Henley, John Kosh – art direction
 John Kosh – design
 David Alexander – photography
 Kosh – artwork
 Norman Seeff – poster design
 Ted Jensen – mastering and remastering
 Lee Hulko – original LP mastering

Charts

Weekly charts

Year-end charts

Certifications and sales

See also
 List of best-selling albums
 List of best-selling albums in the United States
 List of diamond-certified albums in Canada
 List of Billboard 200 number-one albums of 1977

References

Eagles (band) albums
1976 albums
Concept albums
Elektra Records albums
Asylum Records albums
Albums produced by Bill Szymczyk
Albums recorded at Record Plant (Los Angeles)